Tomasz Napoleon Nidecki  (January 2, 1807 in Studzianka, near Radom - June 5, 1852 Warsaw) was a Polish composer, conductor and teacher.

Biography 

He studied composition with Józef Elsner between 1824-27 at the Warsaw School for Music and Dramatic Art and Higher School of Music, thus making him a classmate of Frédéric Chopin.  According to Eugeniusz Szulc via Halina Goldberg's book Music in Chopin's Warsaw (272), Chopin and Nidecki were both chorus or orchestra members of the Lutheran Holy Trinity Church, Warsaw.  During his second visit to Vienna, Chopin met Nidecki, who was studying there between 1828-31. In 1833, Nidecki became director of Theater in der Leopoldstadt.  In 1838 he returned to Warsaw and in 1840 took over the directorship from Karol Kurpinski at the Grand Theatre, Warsaw.

Works

Works for Piano
Polonaise sur des thèmes favoris de l'opéra 'Le Postillon de Longjumeau' 
Mazur z tematów opery 'Koń spiżowy' 
Romance
Rondo

Works for Orchestra
Marsz uroczysty wykonany podczas przeniesienia Obrazu Świętej Weroniki 
Polonaise sur des Motifs de l'Opéra Le Brasseur de Preston 
Polonaise à Grand Orchestre exécutée le 27 Mai / 8 Juin 1846 au Théatre de l'Orangerie à Łazienki
Marsz żałobny (Funeral March) for brass band and choir 
Polonez i hymn Lwowa "Boże Cesarza chroń" 
Overture według melodramatu 'Das Mädchen von Gomez Arias' by A. Schumacher

Vocal and Instrumental
Mass No. 1 for Four Voices ułożona dla Uczniów Gimnazjum Realnego na sopran, alt, tenor i bas z towarzyszeniem orkiestry
Veni Creator (cantata)
Salve Regina
Ave Maria

Operettas
Die Kathi von Hollabrunn, 3 acts
Schneider, Schlosser und Tischler, 3 acts
Der Waldbrand oder Jupiters Strafe, 2 acts
Der Schwur bei den Elementen oder Das Weib als Mann, 3 acts
Versöhnung, Wohltätigkeit und Liebe, 1 act
Der Traum am Tannenbühl oder Drei Jahre in einer Nacht, 2 acts
Die Junggesellen-Wirtschaft im Monde, 2 acts
Der Temperamentenwechsel, 3 acts
Der Geist der düstern Inseln oder der Spiegel der Zukunft, 2 acts

Songs
Hulanka. Mazur do śpiewania lub na pianoforte
Das Grab, words by Johann Gaudenz Salis-Seewis

References

External links 
 
 Scores by Tomasz Napoleon Nidecki in digital library Polona

1807 births
1852 deaths
Polish composers
19th-century composers